This is a list of election results for the electoral district of Rocky River in South Australian elections.

Members for Rocky River

Election results

Elections in the 1980s

Elections in the 1970s

}

Elections in the 1960s

Elections in the 1950s

Elections in the 1940s

Elections in the 1930s

 Preferences were not distributed.

References

South Australian state electoral results by district